UNICEF Kid Power is a philanthropic initiative that was launched in 2015 as a division of the  US Fund for UNICEF. It marks UNICEF's first foray into the hardware space. 
UNICEF Kid Power, with the help of California-based technology firm Calorie Cloud and design studio Ammunition, developed the world's first "Wearable for Good" activity tracker called Kid Power Bands.

These bands act as a kids’ fitness tracker bracelet that connects to a smartphone app. The app lets users complete missions, which counts total steps and awards points. The points then unlock funding from partners, which is then used by UNICEF to deliver packets of therapeutic food to severely malnourished children around the world.

History 

Rajesh Anandan, SVP of Strategic Partnerships and UNICEF Ventures, stated that UNICEF Kid Power and its Kid Power Band product is essentially a digital extension of UNICEF's Trick-or-Treat program, which had been started in 1950.

Partnerships 

UNICEF Kid Power has a number of partnerships and collaborations. On May 22, 2016, UNICEF Kid Power teamed up with Star Wars to create an exclusive Star Wars style Kid Power Band.

The National Basketball Association has also collaborated with UNICEF Kid Power via the Sacramento Kings. The collaboration involves the Kings, UNICEF, & City of Sacramento ‘Kid Power’ Pilot Program, in which all 3 organizations teamed up to leverage the power of technology in an effort to educate and highlight student fitness in the wider Sacramento area.

UNICEF Kid Power has also collaborated in the classroom, with TEACH UNICEF and Scholastic.

UNICEF Kid Power has also teamed up with a number of athletes ranging from Gymnastics, soccer, basketball, baseball and much more. These athletes participated as Kid Power Champions, as part of UNICEF Kid Power's Global Mission program:
	
 Alex Morgan
 Tyson Chandler
 Bethany Mota
 Aly Raisman
 Laurent Duvillier
 Dartanyon Crockett
 Meryl Davis
 David Ortiz
 Maya Moore	
 Cara Yar Khan
 Ashley Eckstein

Outside of athletics, Grammy award-winning artist Pink has also gotten involved as a UNICEF Ambassador as well as a Kid Power National Spokeswoman.

References

External links
 UNICEF USA Announcement
 Medscape Pediatrics: UNICEF Kid Power
 Huffington Post Coverage on UNICEF Kid Power Innovation and Partnership
 Mashable Covers UNICEF Kid Power Bands
 People Magazine Human Interest Story: UNICEF Kid Power Month 2017: How Getting Active Can Help Save Lives
 The Star Wars: Force for Change Initiative in support of: UNICEF Kid Power, American Red Cross, Boys & Girls Clubs of America, and Make-A-Wish
 UNICEF

UNICEF